John Rountry (1843 - 3 October 1901) was a first class fireman of the United States Navy who was awarded the Presidential Medal of Honor for gallantry during the American Civil War. Rountry was awarded the medal on 22 June 1865 for actions performed near Port Royal, South Carolina on 21 September 1864.

Personal life 
Rountry was born in 1843. He died on 3 October 1901 in New York City, New York, and was buried in Holy Cross Cemetery in Brooklyn, New York.

Military service 
Rountry served on the USS Montauk during the war. On the night of 21 September, a fire was discovered in the magazine storage of the ship, leading to panic among the crew members. Rountry forced his way through the crowd and was able to put out the fire.

Rountry's Medal of Honor citation reads:

References 

1843 births
1901 deaths
United States Navy non-commissioned officers
American Civil War recipients of the Medal of Honor
United States Navy Medal of Honor recipients